The Archdiocese of St. John's, Newfoundland is a Latin Church ecclesiastical territory or archdiocese of the Catholic Church in St. John's, Newfoundland and Labrador, Canada. It is the metropolitan of an ecclesiastical province with two suffragan dioceses: Grand Falls, and Corner Brook and Labrador. The current archbishop is Peter Hundt. The Archdiocese of St. John's is the oldest Roman Catholic ecclesiastical jurisdiction in English-speaking North America.

The Basilica of St. John the Baptist is the  cathedral of the archdiocese. The building sits within the St. John's Ecclesiastical District, a National Historic District of Canada.

History
The future Archdiocese of St. John's was established 30 May 1784 as Catholics in Newfoundland gradually gained religious liberty, made explicit by a public declaration by Governor John Campbell. After a request from Irish merchants in St. John's to Bishop William Egan, Bishop of Waterford and Lismore, James Louis O'Donel was appointed Prefect Apostolic of Newfoundland, as a pre-diocesan jurisdiction entitled to a titular bishop and exempt, i.e., directly subject to the Holy See, not part of any ecclesiastical province. In addition to O'Donel's personal popularity, one of his qualifications for the position was an ability to preach in Newfoundland Irish.

It was promoted to a Vicariate Apostolic on 5 January 1796 and on 4 June 1847 was elevated to diocese.

In 1904, St. John's was elevated to an archdiocese and presently contains 40 parishes, 39 active diocesan priests, 33 religious priests, and 120,135 Catholics. It also has 220 Women Religious, and 42 Religious Brothers.

In July 2021, the Archdiocese of St. John's announced plans to sell off assets in order to compensate victims of the Mount Cashel sex abuse scandal.

Sex abuse scandals

For decades, the Archdiocese of St. John's has been tied to sex abuse scandals. In July 2020, Rev. Peter Power, who was originally from the Archdiocese of Toronto, was charged with charges of sexual touching, sexual assault and committing an indecent act involving two teenaged boys, aged 18 and 16 years old at a residence in a small Newfoundland community earlier in the year. Though officially retired, Power was still occasionally active in Catholic ministry when he relocated to Newfoundland. The same month, the Court of Appeal of Newfoundland and Labrador unanimously reversed a 2018 Canadian Supreme ruling and ruled that the Archdiocese of St. John's was liable for the sexual abuse committed at the Mount Cashel Orphanage in the 1950s and 1960s.

Bishops

Prefecture Apostolic of Newfoundland

Vicariate Apostolic of Newfoundland

Diocese of Newfoundland

Diocese of St. John's, Newfoundland

Archdiocese of St. John's, Newfoundland

Coadjutor bishops
 Patrick Lambert, O.F.M. Ref. (1805-1807) as Coadjutor Vicar Apostolic
 Thomas Scallan, O.F.M. Ref.(1815-1816) as Coadjutor Vicar Apostolic
 Michael Anthony Fleming, O.F.M. Ref. (1829-1830) as Coadjutor Vicar Apostolic
 John Thomas Mullock, O.F.M. Ref. (1847-1850)
 Thomas John Flynn (1945-1949), did not succeed to the see

Auxiliary bishop
 Thomas Francis Brennan (1893-1905)
 Patrick James Skinner, C.I.M. (1950-1951), appointed Archbishop here

Other priests of this diocese who became bishops
 Michael Fintan Power, appointed Bishop of Saint George's, Newfoundland in 1911
 Henry Thomas Renouf, appointed Bishop of Saint George's, Newfoundland in 1920
 Raymond John Lahey, appointed Bishop of Saint George's, Newfoundland in 1986

Bibliography
Archdiocese of St. John's, Newfoundland page at catholichierarchy.org retrieved July 14, 2006
Newfoundland Biographies - Newfoundland History retrieved November 30, 2007

References

External links
 
 Basilica Heritage Foundation website

 
Culture of St. John's, Newfoundland and Labrador